Ravi Shankar (born 13 May 1956) is an Indian yoga guru, a spiritual leader. He is frequently referred to as Sri Sri (honorific), Guru ji, or Gurudev. From around the mid 1970s, he worked as an apprentice under Maharishi Mahesh Yogi, the founder of Transcendental Meditation. In 1981, he split from the Transcendental Meditation (TM) and founded the Art of Living foundation.

Life
Ravi Shankar was born in Papanasam, Tamil Nadu, to Vishalakshi and R.S.Venkat Ratnam. He is the brother of Bhanumathi Narasimhan. He was named "Ravi" (a common Indian name which means "sun") because his birth was on a Sunday, and "Shankar" after the eighth-century Hindu saint, Adi Shankara, whose birthday was the same day as Ravi Shankar. Ravi Shankar's first teacher was Sudhakar Chaturvedi, an Indian Vedic Scholar and a close associate of Mahatma Gandhi. He holds a Bachelor of Science degree from the St. Joseph's College of Bengaluru University. After graduation, He travelled with his second teacher, Maharishi Mahesh Yogi, giving talks and arranging conferences on Vedic science, and setting up Transcendental Meditation and Ayurveda centers.

In the 1980s, He initiated a series of practical and experiential courses in spirituality around the globe. He says that his rhythmic breathing practice, Sudarshan Kriya, came to him in 1982, "like a poem, an inspiration", after a ten-day period of silence on the banks of the Bhadra River in Shivamogga, in the state of Karnataka, adding, "I learned it and started teaching it".

In 1983, He held the first Art of Living course in Switzerland. In 1986, he travelled to Apple Valley, California, in the US to conduct the first course to be held in North America.

Philosophy and teachings

Spirituality
He believes spirituality is that which enhances human values such as love, compassion and enthusiasm. It is not limited to any one religion or culture. Hence it is open to all people. He feels the spiritual bond we share as part of the human family is more prominent than nationality, gender, religion, profession, or other identities that separate us.

According to him, science and spirituality are linked and compatible, both springing from the urge to know. The question, "Who am I?" leads to spirituality; the question, "What is this?" leads to science. Emphasizing that joy is only available in the present moment, his stated vision is to create a world free of stress and violence. His programs are said to offer practical tools to help accomplish this. He sees breath as the link between body and mind, and a tool to relax the mind, emphasising the importance of both meditation/spiritual practice and service to others. In his view, "Truth is spherical rather than linear; so it has to be contradictory."

Peace and humanitarian work

Pakistan
He visited Pakistan in 2004 on a goodwill mission and again in 2012 when he inaugurated Art of Living centers in Islamabad and Karachi. The Islamabad center was burned down by armed men in March 2014.

Iraq
During his visits to Iraq, at the invitation of Prime Minister Nouri al Maliki, in 2007 and again in 2008, he met with political and religious leaders to promote global peace. In November 2014, Ravi Shankar visited the relief camps in Erbil, Iraq. He also hosted a conference to address the dire condition of Yazidis and other non-Muslims in the region.

Colombia and FARC
In June 2015, Ravi Shankar met with the delegations of Colombian government and the FARC who were negotiating the resolution to Colombian conflict in Havana. He urged FARC leaders to follow the Gandhian principle of non-violence to attain their political objectives and social justice. For his efforts, Colombia's House of Representatives awarded him the Simón Bolívar Order of Democracy, Knight Cross grade.

Venezuela
In 2019, Ravi Shankar met with Venezuelan leaders from both sides to encourage dialogue, end the political conflict and restore peace and stability in the country.

Kashmir, India
The South Asian Forum for Peace was launched in November 2016 at a conference titled "Kashmir Back to Paradise" in Jammu. According to Ravi Shankar, 90% of people in Kashmir want peace but are neglected. He added, "The solution to the Kashmir problem can only come from the Kashmiris". This forum is intended to bring together eight South Asian countries to cooperate in areas such as entrepreneurship, skill development, cultural exchange, educational partnerships and women's empowerment.

Northeast India
68 militants from 11 militant outfits surrendered to the government in Manipur on the eve of India's 71st Independence Day in August 2017. The Chief Minister of Manipur, N. Biren Singh, lauded Ravi Shankar for his efforts in making this happen and "bringing peace in troubled areas". Ravi Shankar's organization has been working in Manipur for the last 15 years.

In September 2017, at the "Strength in Diversity - North East Indigenous People's Conference", Ravi Shankar claimed that another 500 militants were waiting to "lay down weapons and join the peace process". The conference was attended by representatives from 67 rebel outfits from the Northeast. Expressing his willingness to facilitate the peaceful transition of any rebel group wanting to join the mainstream, Ravi Shankar claimed that his organization has been working for this for the last 10–12 years and "will continue to work until the last gun is laid down". Former ULFA General Secretary, Anup Chetia, who was also the convenor of the conference, appreciated Ravi Shankar's interest and efforts for peace in the region.

Ayodhya Ram Mandir dispute
Ravi Shankar's efforts at mediation in the Ayodhya dispute in 2017 received a mixed response from both Hindu and Muslim leaders. Based on Supreme Court of India's suggestion for an out-of-court settlement, he proposed a mutual compromise where both communities "gift" neighbouring pieces of land to each other. This proposal was met with a lot of skepticism and resistance.

In March 2019, he was appointed by the Supreme Court of India to a 3-member mediation committee tasked with finding a resolution for the case in 8 weeks. In its final verdict, the Supreme Court of India assigned the disputed land to a trust for building a temple and an alternate piece of land nearby to build a mosque.

Interfaith Dialogue
Ravi Shankar is involved in interfaith dialogue and currently sits on the Board of World Religious Leaders for the Elijah Interfaith Institute. Through interfaith summits in 2008 and 2010, he has been engaging faith-based leaders for collective action against HIV. In July 2013 at a meeting in UNAIDS headquarters in Geneva, issues including HIV prevention, gender based violence, stigma and discrimination were discussed.

Prison Program
In 1992, he started a prison programme to rehabilitate prison inmates and help them reintegrate into society.

Awards and recognition
Padma Vibhushan, India's Second Highest Civilian Award, January 2016
Dr Nagendra Singh International Peace Award, India, November 2016
Peru's Highest Award, "Medalla de la Integración en el Grado de Gran Oficial" (Grand Officer)
Colombia's highest civilian award, "Orden de la Democracia Simón Bolívar"
Gandhi, King, Ikeda Community Builders Prize
Highest civilian award "National Order of Mérito de Comuneros", Paraguay, 13 September 2012
Illustrious citizen by the Paraguayan Municipality, 12 September 2012
Illustrious guest of the city of Asunción, Paraguay, 12 September 2012
Tiradentes Medal, the highest honour from Rio de Janeiro State, Brazil, 3 September 2012
The Sivananda World Peace award, Sivananda Foundation, South Africa, 26 August 2012
Crans Montana Forum Award, Brussels, 24 June 2011
Culture in Balance Award, World Culture Forum, Dresden Germany, 10 October 2009
Phoenix Award, Atlanta, USA, 2008
Honorary Citizenship and Goodwill Ambassador, Houston, USA, 2008
Proclamation of Commendation, New Jersey, USA 2008
Sant Shri Dnyaneshwara World Peace Prize, Pune, India, 11 January 2007
Order of the Pole Star, Mongolia, 2006
Bharat Shiromani Award, New Delhi, India, 2005
 Honorary Doctorates from – Universidad Autónoma de Asunción of Paraguay, Buenos Aires University, Argentina; Siglo XXI University Campus, Cordoba, Argentina; Nyenrode Business University, Netherlands; Gyan Vihar University, Jaipur

In 2009, Shankar was named by Forbes magazine as the fifth most powerful leader in India.

Criticism
In 2012, Ravi Shankar, while attending a function in Jaipur, claimed that some Indian government schools are breeding grounds for Naxalism, a movement of militant communist groups in India declared to be terrorist organisations. "All government schools and colleges should be privatised. The government should not run any school. It's often found that children from government schools get into Naxalism and violence. Children from private schools don't get into this," he was quoted as saying by media reports. Later, Shankar issued a clarification that he didn't mean that all government schools breed Naxalism. More clarification followed on his Twitter account: "I specifically referred to sick government schools in Naxal affected areas. Many who have turned to Naxalism have come from these schools. I did not say all Govt schools (where lakhs study) breed Naxalism. Great talents have emerged from these schools & I would never generalize." In March 2018, he faced criticism from political leaders for his commentary, where he said, India will turn into Syria if the Ram temple issue is not resolved soon.

Bibliography 

 An Intimate Note to the Sincere Seeker; Vol. 1: , Vol. 2: , Vol. 3: , Vol. 4: , Vol. 5: , Vol. 6: , Vol. 7: 
 Buddha: manifestation of silence, 
 1999 – Be A Witness: The Wisdom of the Upanishads, 106 pp. 
 2000 – God Loves Fun, 138 pp. 
 2001 – Celebrating Silence: Excerpts from Five Years of Weekly Knowledge 1995–2000, 206 pp. 
 Celebrating Love 
 2005 – Narada Bhakti Sutra, 129 pp. 
Hinduism & Islam, the common thread, 34 pp, 2002
 Secrets of Relationships, Arktos, 2014
 Patanjali Yoga Sutras, Arktos, 2014
 Ashtavakra Gita, 2010, 
 Management Mantras, Arktos, 2014
 Know Your Child: The Art of Raising Children, Arktos, 2014

Biography

See also
 List of peace activists

References

Bibliography
 (First edition: India, Books Today, 2002. )

External links

 

1956 births
Living people
Nonviolence advocates
21st-century Hindu religious leaders
Hindu mystics
Indian Hindu spiritual teachers
Indian spiritual writers
People from Thanjavur district
Recipients of the Padma Vibhushan in other fields
St. Joseph's College, Bangalore alumni
University and college founders
Indian environmentalists
Transcendental Meditation exponents
Neo-Vedanta
Neo-Advaita teachers
20th-century Indian philosophers
Modern yoga gurus